The non-marine molluscs of Zambia are a part of the molluscan fauna of Zambia (wildlife of Zambia). Zambia is land-locked and therefore has no marine species.

A number of species of non-marine molluscs are found in the wild in Zambia.

Freshwater gastropods 
Freshwater gastropods in Zambia include:

Paludomidae
 Hirthia globosa Ancey, 1898
 Hirthia littorina Ancey, 1898
 Martelia dautzenbergi Dupuis, 1924
 Martelia tanganyicensis Dautzenberg, 1908

Planorbidae
 Bulinus africanus (Krauss, 1848)
 Bulinus globosus (Morelet, 1866)

Land gastropods 
Land gastropods in Zambia include:

Freshwater bivalves
Freshwater bivalves in Zambia include:

See also
Lists of molluscs of surrounding countries:
 List of non-marine molluscs of the Democratic Republic of the Congo, Wildlife of the Democratic Republic of the Congo
 List of non-marine molluscs of Tanzania, Wildlife of Tanzania
 List of non-marine molluscs of Malawi, Wildlife of Malawi
 List of non-marine molluscs of Mozambique, Wildlife of Mozambique
 List of non-marine molluscs of Zimbabwe, Wildlife of Zimbabwe
 List of non-marine molluscs of Botswana, Wildlife of Botswana
 List of non-marine molluscs of Namibia, Wildlife of Namibia
 List of non-marine molluscs of Angola, Wildlife of Angola

References

 molluscs, Non marine

Molluscs
Zambia
Zambia